Novopetrovka is a rural locality (a selo) in Krestovozdvizhensky Selsoviet of Konstantinovsky District, Amur Oblast, Russia. The population was 531 as of 2018. There are 6 streets.

Geography 
Novopetrovka is located on the left bank of the Amur River, 27 km east of Konstantinovka (the district's administrative centre) by road. Voykovo is the nearest rural locality.

References 

Rural localities in Konstantinovsky District